Pontus Karlsson (born 19 August 1983) is a retired Swedish football midfielder.

Spending his entire youth and senior career in Åtvidabergs FF, including a spell in Allsvenskan, in 2011 he was loaned out to BK Kenty.

References

1983 births
Living people
Swedish footballers
Åtvidabergs FF players
Association football midfielders
Superettan players
Allsvenskan players